The Left-Hander is a 1987 Soviet comedy drama directed by Sergei Ovcharov, based on The Left-Hander by Nikolai Leskov. The film features Nikolay Stotskiy, Vladimir Gostyukhin, and Leonid Kuravlyov.

Plot
Emperor Alexander Pavlovich together with his faithful servant, Cossack Ataman Platov, come to London after the war of 1812. The British are trying to persuade the king to come on their side by showing him various inventions, but Platov insists that the Russians are more skillful.

One day the British demonstrate to the Emperor the nymphozoria – an iron flea that can dance.

Alexander leaves and a few months later he dies, leaving the flea to priest Fedota. His brother, Nikolai "Palkovic" tells Platov to look for artisans who will make better handiwork than the English flea. Ataman finds them, but Platov scolds the masters who put a horseshoe on the flea because the flea stops dancing after the procedure, and takes Lefty away with him who made nails for the flea without leaving him any identifying documents.

When the emperor understands everything, he orders to give the best clothing to Lefty and sends him abroad. The Left-Hander sees that the British do not clean guns with crushed bricks and asks to be sent back. But on the way he has drinks with the ship's skipper, and on arrival while inebriated and lacking identification is sent to the Obukhov Hospital for the destitute. There he dies, having said to Dr. Solski, "Tell the Emperor that the English do not clean their guns with brick; they should not clean this way either by us." But the doctor fearing threats of Count Chernyshev does not tell this to the emperor.

Cast
Nikolai Stotskii - The Left-Hander / Lefty
Vladimir Gostyukhin - Ataman Platov
Leonid Kuravlyov - Emperor Alexander I Pavlovich
Yury Yakovlev - Emperor Nicholas I "Palkovic"
Lev Lemke - Minister Kiselvrode
Alexander Susnin - old blacksmith
Sergey Parshin - Tula gunsmith
Nikolai Lavrov - black gentleman
Nikolai Kryukov - English admiral
Victor Smirnov - skipper
Anatoly Slivnik - policeman
Viktor Bychkov - dandy
Evgeny Baranov
Konstantin Vorobyov
Valery Zakharov
Arkadiy Koval
Joseph Krinsky
Olga Samoshina
Stanislav Sokolov
George Teyh - courtier
Anatoly Khudoleev
Alfred Shargorodskii
Aleksandr Estrin

References

External links

1987 comedy-drama films
1987 films
Soviet comedy-drama films
Russian comedy-drama films
Films based on short fiction
Cultural depictions of Nicholas I of Russia
Films set in London
Films set in the 19th century